Marie Toomey (3 October 1923 – 29 March 2014) was a tennis player from Australia who reached the women's singles final of the 1948 Australian Championships, losing to Nancye Wynne Bolton 6–3, 6–1.  Toomey teamed with Doris Hart to reach the women's doubles final of the 1949 Australian Championships, losing to Bolton and Thelma Coyne Long 6–0, 6–1.

Grand Slam finals

Singles (1 runner-up)

Doubles (1 runner-up)

Grand Slam singles tournament timeline

1In 1946 and 1947, the French Championships were held after Wimbledon.

See also 
 Performance timelines for all female tennis players who reached at least one Grand Slam final

References 

Australian female tennis players
1923 births
2014 deaths